Radošovice is a municipality and village in Strakonice District in the South Bohemian Region of the Czech Republic. It has about 700 inhabitants.

Administrative parts
Villages and hamlets of Jedraž, Kapsova Lhota, Milíkovice and Svaryšov are administrative parts of Radošovice.

References

Villages in Strakonice District